No Protection is a 1995 dub remix of Massive Attack's second album Protection by the British dub producer Mad Professor.

Background 
Mad Professor was contacted by Massive Attack after Protection was released to remix a song for a single. After the single was remixed, the band asked Mad Professor to listen to more of the album to explore the possibility of further remixes.  The project then became a track by track remix of almost the entire album. Mad Professor heavily edited the original material to form a slow, pulsating mix in which the beat is emphasised, reverb is extensively used and the occasional vocals (many of the tracks are almost entirely instrumental) fade in-and-out in typical dub fashion.

Critical reception 

According to music journalist Robert Christgau, No Protection was the most ballyhooed album during dub music's revival in the mid-1990s and In his review for The Village Voice, he found the music well defined and textured: "It also sustains a convincing gravity—a sense that all these whooshings and clangings and suckings and scrapings and boomings and snatches of tune relate to each other and the rest of the physical universe."

Track listing
"Radiation Ruling the Nation" (based on "Protection") – 8:35
"Bumper Ball Dub" (based on "Karmacoma") – 5:59
"Trinity Dub" (based on "Three") – 4:22
"Cool Monsoon" (based on "Weather Storm") – 7:10
"Eternal Feedback" (based on "Sly") – 6:26
"Moving Dub" (based on "Better Things") – 5:57
"I Spy" (based on "Spying Glass") – 5:07
"Backward Sucking" (based on "Heat Miser") – 6:17

References

External links
Mad Professor MySpace page
Massive Attack home page

Massive Attack albums
Albums produced by Nellee Hooper
1995 remix albums